The Bavarian Class C, later C II, was a German steam locomotive with the Bavarian Eastern Railway (Bayerische Ostbahn).

These engines were the first six-coupled vehicles in Bavaria with external frames. In addition they had Stephenson valve gear and, because the final axle was driven, a very long connecting rod with a Hall crank (Hallscher Kurbel). Because of its large wheel diameter, it could also be used to haul passenger trains. 

The locomotives were equipped with 3 T 9 tenders.

See also
Royal Bavarian State Railways
List of Bavarian locomotives and railbuses

0-6-0 locomotives
C II (Ostbahn)
Standard gauge locomotives of Germany
Railway locomotives introduced in 1862
C n2 locomotives
Freight locomotives